Wallflower is the twelfth studio album by Canadian singer Diana Krall, released on February 3, 2015, by Verve Records. The album was produced by David Foster. The album's supporting tour, Wallflower World Tour, began in Boston on February 25, 2015.

Recording
The album consists of cover songs of various pop and rock songs, the only previously unreleased track being "If I Take You Home Tonight" by Paul McCartney. He wrote the song for his album Kisses on the Bottom, in which he collaborated with Krall. Although the song did not make the cut for that album, Krall asked McCartney if she could record the song, and he gave his consent.

Critical reception

Wallflower received mixed reviews from music critics. At Metacritic, which assigns a normalized rating out of 100 to reviews from mainstream publications, the album received an average score of 58, based on 10 reviews.

Neil McCormick of The Daily Telegraph stated, "It is a lovely Valentine record, if you favour melancholic songs about missed chances. The set feels overfamiliar, though, drawing heavily on classic Seventies ballads by the Carpenters, Eagles, Elton John and 10CC. A moodily evocative reading of a gorgeous new Paul McCartney song, "I'll Take You Home Tonight", suggests this album might have been more interesting if Krall had dared to take the middle-of-the-road less travelled".

Jim Farber of the New York Daily News wrote, "Wallflower breaks another pattern for Krall. It eschews her frequent focus on American standards. But the sexiness and spring she brought to the best of those covers rarely comes into play here".

Commercial performance
Wallflower debuted at number two on the Canadian Albums Chart, selling 13,000 copies in its first week. By January 2016, the album had sold 66,000 copies in Canada.

In the United States, it entered the Billboard 200 at number 10 with first-week sales of 44,000 copies, becoming Krall's sixth top-10 album on the chart. The album debuted at number 19 on the UK Albums Chart with 3,511 copies sold in its first week.

Track listing

Personnel
Credits adapted from the liner notes of the deluxe edition of Wallflower.

Musicians

 Diana Krall – vocals ; piano 
 David Foster – orchestra arrangements ; keyboards ; piano ; string quartet arrangements ; horn arrangements ; arrangements 
 William Ross – orchestra arrangements 
 Graham Nash – background vocals 
 Stephen Stills – background vocals ; electric guitar 
 Christian McBride – bass 
 Ramón Stagnaro – acoustic guitar 
 Michael Thompson – EBow electric guitar ; acoustic guitar ; electric guitar ; guitars 
 Jochem van der Saag – synths ; programming ; sound design 
 Karriem Riggins – drums 
 Michael Bublé – vocals 
 Chris Walden – orchestra arrangements ; string quartet arrangements 
 Dennis Crouch – bass 
 Jim Keltner – drums 
 Dean Parks – guitars 
 Blake Mills – guitar 
 Nathan East – bass 
 Timothy B. Schmit – background vocals 
 Rafael Padilla – percussion 
 Bryan Adams – vocals 
 Vince Mendoza – orchestra arrangements 
 Georgie Fame – vocals 
 Jerry Hey – horn arrangements 
 Joey DeFrancesco – B-3 organ 
 Steve Jordan – drums 
 Sean Billings – trumpet 
 Matt DeMerritt – tenor saxophone 
 Chris Lea – tenor saxophone 
 Elizabeth Lea – trombone 
 Gavin Greenaway – orchestra conducting
 Susie Gillis – orchestra conducting assistance
 Everton Nelson – orchestra leader

Technical

 David Foster – production
 Jochem van der Saag – co-production, mixing, engineering
 Jorge Vivo – recording, engineering
 Steve Price – orchestra recording
 Steve Genewick – Pro Tools, engineering assistance
 Roy Henderickson – recording engineering
 Daniel Fyfe – recording engineering assistance
 Anders Pantzer – recording engineering
 Chris Owens – engineering assistance
 Spencer Sunshine – recording engineering
 Chris Parker – engineering
 Paul Forgues – engineering assistance
 Guillame Dujardin – engineering
 Andreas Carlsson – production (Georgie Fame vocals)
 Hank Linderman – recording (Timothy B. Schmit vocals)
 Nuno Fernandes – recording (Bryan Adams vocals)
 Adam Miller – Pro Tools engineering
 Paul Blakemore – mastering

Artwork
 Coco Shinomiya – design
 Mr. Fotheringham – illustration
 Bryan Adams – photography

Charts

Weekly charts

Year-end charts

Certifications

Notes

References

2015 albums
Albums produced by David Foster
Albums recorded at Capitol Studios
Covers albums
Diana Krall albums
Verve Records albums